Fort Lawton was a United States Army post located in the Magnolia neighborhood of Seattle, Washington overlooking Puget Sound. In 1973 a large majority of the property, 534 acres of Fort Lawton, was given to the city of Seattle and dedicated as Discovery Park. Both the fort and the nearby residential neighborhood of Lawton Wood are named after Major General Henry Ware Lawton.

While Fort Lawton was a quiet outpost prior to World War II, it became the second largest port of embarkation of soldiers and materiel to the Pacific Theater during the war. The fort was included in the 2005 Base Realignment and Closure list. Fort Lawton officially closed on September 14, 2011.

History

In 1896, the Secretary of War selected what would later be Fort Lawton for construction of an artillery battery intended to defend Seattle and the south Puget Sound from naval attack. Local citizens and governments donated  land to the United States Army for the installation the next year.

Fort Lawton was named after Major General Henry Ware Lawton (1843–1899), a veteran of the American Civil War, the Indian Wars, and Spanish–American War campaigns, who was killed in action in the Philippines.

The military encampment was redesigned in 1902 for infantry use. In 1910, a design overhaul, to include housing for officers and enlisted men, was prepared by landscape architect John C. Olmsted. In 1938 during the Great Depression, the Army offered to sell Fort Lawton back to the city of Seattle for one dollar, but the city declined, citing maintenance concerns.

Boxer Rebellion 
Fort Lawton was used as a marshaling camp for soldiers preparing to travel to China to deal with the Boxer Rebellion. Seattle photographer Theodore E. Peiser photographed horse corrals, soldiers, and United States Army Transport ships that departed Seattle for Nome, Alaska, on their way to China.

Buffalo Soldiers 

On October 5, 1909, the United States Army's 25th Infantry Regiment which primarily consisted of African American soldiers transferred from the Philippines to Fort Lawton. These men are known as the Buffalo Soldiers. The initial 900 men stationed at the fort and their families accounted for about a third of Seattle's African American population.

World War II 
During World War II, at least 20,000 troops at a time were stationed at Fort Lawton, with more than 1 million troops passing through both before and after the war. It was the second-largest port of embarkation for US forces and material to the Pacific Theater during the war.

The post was also used as a prisoner-of-war camp, with more than 1,000 Germans imprisoned there. Approximately 5,000 Italians were passed through en route to Hawaii for imprisonment. On August 15, 1944 an Italian POW, Guglielmo Olivotto, was found murdered at Fort Lawton after a night of rioting between Italian POWs and American soldiers. Twenty-eight African-American soldiers were later court-martialed, convicted of the crime, and sent to prison. They and their families challenged the convictions; after an investigation, the convictions were set aside in 2007. A formal army apology ceremony was held on July 26, 2008; officials also presented the relatives of former US soldiers and the two remaining survivors with years of back pay, following the overturn of their dishonorable discharges.

On Memorial Day 1951, a grove of trees and monument honoring the war dead was dedicated near the post chapel. The Korean War brought a flurry of activity as troops headed to or returned from Korea were processed through Fort Lawton. In February 1953, the Fort Lawton Processing Center transferred half of its functions, the outbound tasks, to Fort Lewis (now called Joint Base Lewis McChord). Returnees continued to process through Fort Lawton.

In 1960, the Air Force established a radar station at Fort Lawton. Additionally, Nike anti-aircraft missiles and Air Force radars were in use at Fort Lawton, but in 1968 the site was rejected for proposed defense upgrades. 

In 1970, the fort was occupied for three weeks in March by a group of Native Americans, led by Bernie Whitebear, asserting that the Native Americans had claim to the land that was surplus to requirements. The Native Americans succeeded in garnering 40 acres of land and the establishment of the Daybreak Star Cultural Center, but  of the land was declared surplus by the Army in 1971. The property was transferred back to the city in 1972, and dedicated as Discovery Park in 1973.

Closure 
In 2005, the fort was included in the Base Realignment and Closure list for that year. Fort Lawton's family housing, consisting of the non-commissioned officer housing below and officer housing on the crown of the hill, has been used by the U.S. Navy for Navy and Coast Guard personnel for almost 40 years. They were purchased by a private developer, remodeled, and now in private ownership. The Capehart Housing in the center of the park was vacated by December 2009 and demolished during the summer of 2010; the land has become part of Discovery Park.

Fort Lawton officially closed on September 14, 2011, and the 364th Expeditionary Sustainment Command, the last U.S. Army Reserve tenant on the post, moved to its new facility in Marysville, Washington. A closing ceremony took place on February 25, 2012. The remainder of the fort property (with the exception of the military cemetery on site) was transferred to the City of Seattle in 2012. As of 2018, there are plans to convert the property into low-income housing.  On 10 June 2019 the Seattle City Council voted to build 200-plus low-income and homeless housing units on part of the property but local residents sued to block such development.

Historic district
The Fort Lawton Historic District (FLHD) in the heart of Discovery Park contains numerous historic buildings and structures that were once in, and part of, Fort Lawton. The following list includes only buildings and structures that survived at least into the 1980s.

Source for buildings, construction dates, comments:

The Chapel
Chapel-on-the-Hill, outside the Historic District, has the status of a city landmark.
In July 2008, the City Council passed an ordinance that changed the boundary of the Fort Lawton Landmark District to include the Chapel and the Chapel Grounds.

References
 Fort Lawton Landmark District, Department of Neighborhoods (City of Seattle)
 Heather MacIntosh, Preservation at Fort Lawton and Discovery Park, Preservation Seattle (Historic Seattle), January 2004.
 
 City of Seattle ordinance number 114011 Retrieved 2015-12-16.

Notes

External links

 Impromptu query for historical sites in Magnolia, Department of Neighborhoods (City of Seattle). Most of the listings are Fort Lawton buildings.
 Fort Lawton Cemetery listing at Find a Grave
Fort Lawton housing redevelopment

 Seattle Chamber of Commerce Army Post Committee. 1896-1897. 1 volume.  Contains records about the fundraising campaign ran by the Army Post Committee to raise funds for the purchase of land for Fort Lawton. At the Labor Archives of Washington, University of Washington Libraries Special Collection.

Lawton
National Register of Historic Places in Seattle
Closed installations of the United States Army
Military facilities in Seattle
Lawton
Magnolia, Seattle
Military installations established in 1900